The Kreativ Dental European Tour 2014/2015 – Event 6 (also known as the 2015 Kreativ Dental Gdynia Open) was a professional minor-ranking snooker tournament that took place between 25 February–1 March 2015 at the Gdynia Sports Arena in Gdynia, Poland.

Shaun Murphy was the defending champion, but he lost 2–4 against Neil Robertson in the semi-finals.

Neil Robertson won his fourth minor-ranking event title by defeating Mark Williams 4–0 in the final.

Prize fund 
The breakdown of prize money of the event is shown below:

Main draw

Preliminary rounds

Round 1 
Best of 7 frames

Round 2 
Best of 7 frames

Round 3 
Best of 7 frames

Main rounds

Top half

Section 1

Section 2

Section 3

Section 4

Bottom half

Section 5

Section 6

Section 7

Section 8

Finals

Century breaks 

 142, 137, 136, 118, 109, 108  Neil Robertson
 142  Kurt Maflin
 142  Mark Joyce
 140, 132, 111, 107, 103, 101  Shaun Murphy
 139  Charlie Walters
 135  Stuart Bingham
 131  Anthony McGill
 130  Robin Hull
 130  Michael Georgiou
 128, 119, 106, 104  Judd Trump
 128, 105  Robert Milkins
 127, 104, 101  Dylan Craig
 124  Jamie Cope
 123  Mark Davis
 120, 103, 101  Mark Williams
 120  Paul Davison
 116, 105, 102  Joe Perry
 114  Graeme Dott
 112  Stuart Carrington

 112  Luca Brecel
 111, 108  Adam Duffy
 111, 106  Martin Gould
 110, 107  Jimmy Robertson
 110  Rod Lawler
 109  Jamie Clarke
 109  Thomas Dowling
 108  Anthony Jeffers
 106  Ross Muir
 105, 104  Jamie Jones
 105  Dechawat Poomjaeng
 104, 101  Michael Wasley
 104  Jamie Burnett
 103  Michael White
 103  Chris Wakelin
 102  Tony Drago
 100  Ryan Day
 100  Steven Hallworth
 100  Ricky Walden

References

External links 
 

Gdynia Open
ET6
2015 in Polish sport